The Attukal Bhagavathy Temple is a Hindu religious shrine at Attukal in Kerala, India. Goddess Bhadrakali (Kannaki), mounted over 'vethala', is the main deity in this temple. Bhadrakali, a form of Mahakali, who killed the demon king Daruka, believed to be born from the third eye of lord Shiva. 'Bhadra' means good and 'Kali' means goddess of time. So Bhadrakali is considered as the goddess of prosperity and salvation. Goddess 'Attukal devi', itself is the supreme mother 'Bhaadrkali devi', (in soumya aspect) the goddess of power and courage. She is often referred as Kannaki, the heroine of Ilanko Adikal's 'Silapathikaaram'. The temple is renowned for the annual Attukal Pongal festival, in which over three million women participate. A festival that has figured in the Guinness Book of World Records for being the single largest gathering of women for a religious activity, the Attukal Pongala continues to draw millions of women with each passing year. According to the Attukal Temple Trust, around 4.9 million devotees are expected to attend the pongala in 2016. Attukal Temple is situated near the heart of the city, 2 kilometres away from Sree Padmanabhaswamy Temple, East Fort in Thiruvananthapuram. Devotees believe that all of their wishes will be fulfilled by the goddess, provide prosperity and can attain salvation. Attukal devi is often worshipped in 3 forms such as Maha Saraswati (goddess of knowledge, arts, and language), Maha Lakshmi (goddess of wealth, auspiciousness, and power) and Mahakali/ Parvathy (goddess of marriage, time, death).

History 

The Goddess Kannaki (Bhadrakali) is the main deity in this temple. The mythology behind the temple, relates to the story of Kannagi who was married to Kovalan, son of a wealthy merchant. After marriage, Kovalan met a dancer Madhavi and spent all his riches on her forgetting his wife. But when he was penniless, he went back to Kannagi. The only precious thing left to be sold was Kannagi's pair of anklets. They went with it to the king of Madurai to sell it. But an anklet was stolen from the Queen which looked similar to Kannagi's. When Kovalan tried to sell it, he was mistaken for the theft and beheaded by the king's soldiers.

Kannagi got infuriated when she heard the news and rushed to the King with the second pair of anklet. She broke one of the anklets and it contained rubies while the Queen's contained pearls. She cursed the city of Madurai, and it is said that due to her chastity, the curse came true and Madurai burned. Kannagi is said to have attained salvation after the Goddess of the city appeared before her.

It is said that on her way to Kodungallur, Kannagi passed Attukal. She took the form of a little girl. An old man was sitting on the banks of a stream, when the girl went to him and asked him whether he could help her cross it. Surprised to find the young girl alone, he took her home. After a awhile she disappeared. She came back in his sleep and asked him to build a temple where he found 3 golden lines in his grove. He went ahead and did the same, and it is said that this is at the location of the present Attukal temple. Goddess Attukalamma (Bhadrakali/Kannaki) is believed to be present at Attukal during the festival days. Ponkala is offered to celebrate the victory of Kannaki over the king Pandya. Another story says that 'Attukal devi' is Bhadrakali, born from the third eye of lord Shiva to kill the demon king Daruka. Mother Bhadrakali is a form of Shakthi devi (Mahakali) worshipped mainly in Kerala. 'Bhadra' means good and 'Kali' means goddess of time. So Bhadrakali is often referred as the goddess of prosperity, time and salvation.

Pongala festival 

Attukal Pongala is the main festival of this temple. Attukal Pongala Mahotsavam is a 10 days festival which falls on February – March every year (Malayalam month of Kumbham). The festival begins on the Karthika star with the traditional Kappukettu and Kudiyiruthu ceremony, the idol of Devi, is embellished with Kappu (Bangles). 

The 9th day of the festival, 'Pooram day' is the major attraction, The Attukal Pongala day and the festival will conclude with the Kuruthitharpanam at 10th day makam star night.

Millions of women gather every year in the month of Kumbham around this temple and prepare Pongala (rice cooked with jaggery, ghee, coconut as well as other ingredients) in the open in small pots to please the Goddess Kannaki. Pongala (literally means to boil over) is a ritualistic offering of a sweet dish, consisting of rice porridge, sweet brown molasses, coconut gratings, nuts and raisins. It is done as an offering to the presiding deity of the temple – the Goddess – popularly known as Attukal Amma. Goddess Attukal devi is believed to fulfill their wishes and provide prosperity.

Other festivals 
The other festivals in this temple are:

 Mandala Vratham – Festival in connection with the annual Utsavam of Sabarimala
 Vinayaka Chathurthi – Pooja to the Lord Ganapathy
 Pooja Vaypu – Identical to Dussera festival (Saraswathy Pooja and Vidyarambham)
 Sivarathri – Siva Pooja
 Karthika – Karthika Deepa
 Ayilya Pooja – Milk, flowers etc. offered to serpent God and special rites
 Aiswarya Pooja – On all full moon (Pournami) days
 Nirayum Puthariyum (Ramayana Parayanam) – During the month of Karkadakam
 Akhandanama Japam – 4th Sunday of every month

See also
 Kannagi
 Vellayani Devi Temple
 List of Hindu temples in Kerala
 Temples of Kerala

References 

https://web.archive.org/web/20170317235359/http://roughroads.com/attukal-pongala-of-trivandrum-national-festival-of-women/ Attukal Pongala of Trivandrum- National festival of Women
http://www.stancemagazine.in/a-goddesss-biography/
https://web.archive.org/web/20161010184502/http://www.yentha.com/news/view/features/no-stones-left-unturned-journey-with-attukal-amma
http://www.newindianexpress.com/cities/thiruvananthapuram/2016/aug/02/Delving-into-the-mystery-of-Attukal-Bhagavathy-1500875.html
https://www.scribd.com/document/326477317/Attukal-Amma-and-Kannaki-of-Chilappathikaram-Are-Two-Different-Entities
http://www.deccanchronicle.com/lifestyle/books-and-art/070816/attukal-amma-when-devotees-fight-over-deity.html

External links

   A book on Attukal Amma by Lekshmy Rajeev
 http://www.attukal.org/ – Website of the Attukal Bhagavathy Temple.
 Attukal Devi Temple Festival Details – Attukal Devi Temple Festival Details
 https://web.archive.org/web/20120618044738/http://www.p4panorama.com/panos/Attukal_temple/index.html Attukal temple panoramic view
 https://web.archive.org/web/20131230233102/http://mapkerala.in/page/attukal_temple
http://www.epw.in/system/files/pdf/2014_49/17/Attukal_Pongala_Youth_Clubs_Neighbourhood_Groups_and_Masculine_Performance_of_Religiosity.pdf  – Article on the gender politics of the Attukal Pongala in the Economic and Political Weekly

Hindu pilgrimage sites in India
Hindu temples in Thiruvananthapuram
Devi temples in Kerala